Edita Mazurevičiūtė (born 10 January 1996) is a track cyclist from  Lithuania. She represented her nation at the 2015 UCI Track Cycling World Championships.

Major results
2015
3rd Scratch Race, Panevezys

References

External links
 profile at cyclngarchives.com

1986 births
Lithuanian female cyclists
Living people